HMS Cossack was a  which was laid down as Witjas for the Imperial Russian Navy. She was seized due to the Crimean War breaking out whilst she was under construction and taken into service with the Royal Navy.

History
HMS Cossack was a wooden 20-gun corvette, built at Northfleet and launched on 15 May 1854. She was originally laid down for the Imperial Russian Navy as the corvette Witjas, however was confiscated during the Crimean War in 1854.

On 28 October 1854, she ran aground on the Draystone Rock, off Sheerness, Kent. Her captain was severely reprimanded at the ensuing court-martial. During the Crimean War, four vessels of the Royal Navy—Arrogant, Cossack, Magicienne, and Ruby—silenced the Russian batteries at a fort on Gogland on 21 July 1855. Cossack also participated in the blockade of the Courland coast, in July 1855 helped in the capture of Kotka's Island and in August was part of the bombardment of Sveaborg.

On 9 January 1861, she ran into the merchant ship John and Henry, severely damaging the starboard side of John and Henry, which Cossack towed in to Portsmouth, Hampshire. Her next posting was on Cape of Good Hope Station, she transported Sir George Grey to his posting as Governor of New Zealand in 1861.  She was later sent to China Station before joining the Australia Station in September 1871. In June 1872 the new town for Port Walcott on Western Australia's northwest coast was named Cossack to commemorate a visit in December 1871 with the colonial Governor of Western Australia Sir Frederick Weld on board. She left the Australia Station in 1873 and sailed for England.

She was sold to Castle for breaking up at Charlton in May 1875.

Citations

References
Bastock, John (1988), Ships on the Australia Station, Child & Associates Publishing Pty Ltd; Frenchs Forest, Australia.

External links
 

 

1854 ships
Corvettes of the Royal Navy
Ships built in Northfleet
Crimean War naval ships of the United Kingdom
Maritime incidents in October 1854